The Făncica is a right tributary of the river Barcău in Romania. It discharges into the Barcău near the village Făncica.

References

Rivers of Romania
Rivers of Bihor County